The 2015–16 Columbia Lions men's basketball team represented Columbia University during the 2015–16 NCAA Division I men's basketball season. The Lions, led by sixth year head coach Kyle Smith, played their home games at Levien Gymnasium and were members of the Ivy League. They finished the season 25–10, 10–4 in Ivy League play to finish in third place. They were invited to the CollegeInsider.com Tournament where they defeated Norfolk State, Ball State, NJIT and UC Irvine to become CIT champions.

On March 30, one day after winning the CIT, head coach Kyle Smith resigned to become the head coach at San Francisco. He finished at Columbia with a six-year record of 101–82.

Previous season
The Lions finished the season 13–15, 5–9 in Ivy League play to finish in a tie for fifth place.

Departures

Recruiting

Recruiting class of 2016

Roster

Schedule

|-
!colspan=9 style="background:#75b2dd; color:#FFFFFF;"| Non-conference regular season

|-
!colspan=9 style="background:#75b2dd; color:#FFFFFF;"| Ivy League regular season

|-
!colspan=9 style="background:#75b2dd; color:#FFFFFF;"| CIT

References

Columbia Lions men's basketball seasons
Columbia
Columbia
CollegeInsider.com Postseason Tournament championship seasons
Columbia
Columbia